Orabi is a surname. Notable people with the surname include:

Ahmed ‘Urabi ("Orabi" in Egyptian Arabic; 1841–1911), Egyptian rebel and patriot
Ibrahim Orabi (born 1912), Egyptian sport wrestler
Mohamed Orabi (born 1951), Egyptian diplomat and politician
Osama Orabi (born 1962), Egyptian footballer
Shams ad-Din Orabi (died 2009), Libyan politician